The 1994 TFL Statewide League premiership season was an Australian rules football competition, staged across Tasmania, Australia over twenty roster rounds and six finals series matches between 9 April and 24 September 1994.
This was the ninth season of statewide football and the League was known as the Cascade-Boags Draught Super League under a dual commercial naming-rights sponsorship agreement with both Cascade Brewery in Hobart and Boag's Brewery in Launceston.

Participating Clubs
Burnie Hawks Football Club
Clarence District Football Club
Devonport Football Club
Glenorchy District Football Club
Hobart Football Club
Launceston Football Club
New Norfolk District Football Club
North Hobart Football Club
North Launceston Football Club
Sandy Bay Football Club
South Launceston Football Club

1994 TFL Statewide League Club Coaches
Mark Lee (Burnie Hawks)
Stevie Wright (Clarence)
Andy Goodwin (Devonport)
Kim Excell (Glenorchy)
Wayne Petterd (Hobart)
Peter Chisnall (Launceston)
Darren Dennemann (New Norfolk)
Andy Bennett (North Hobart)
Robert Groenewegen (North Launceston)
Chris Fagan (Sandy Bay)
Dale Weightman (South Launceston)

TFL Statewide League Reserves Grand Final
Sandy Bay 12.21 (93) v Nth Hobart 10.5 (65) – North Hobart Oval

TFL Statewide League Colts (Under-19's) Grand Final
New Norfolk 11.15 (81) v Burnie Hawks 9.6 (60) – North Hobart Oval
Note: This season saw a Northern & Southern Colts Final, the premiers of each met in the Statewide Final.

TFL Fourths (Under-17's) Grand Final
Glenorchy 5.10 (40) v New Norfolk 5.8 (38)

Leading Goalkickers: TFL Statewide League
Paul Dac (Clarence) – 94

Medal Winners
Michael Maple (North Hobart) – William Leitch Medal
Jason Wilton (New Norfolk) – Darrel Baldock Medal (Best player in TFL Grand Final)
Stephen Jackson (Burnie Hawks) – George Watt Medal (Reserves)
Aaron Priest (Clarence) & Jonathon Alexander (Sth Launceston) – V.A Geard Medal (Under-19's)
Damian Triffitt (New Norfolk) – D.R Plaister Medal (Under-17's)
Daniel Hulm (Clarence) – Lefroy Medal (Best player in Interstate match)
Shane Smith (Devonport) – Bob Withers Medal (Best player in Tasmania v Richmond game)

Interstate Matches
Exhibition Match (Saturday, 30 April 1994)
Richmond 17.13 (115) v Tasmania 14.7 (91) – Att: 4,108 at North Hobart Oval
Queensland 18.18 (126) v Tasmania 10.10 (70) - Brisbane

1994 TFL Statewide League Ladder

Round 1
(Saturday, 9 April & Sunday, 10 April 1994)
Sandy Bay 14.15 (99) v Burnie Hawks 11.14 (80) – Att: 728 at North Hobart Oval
Clarence 17.11 (113) v Nth Hobart 8.14 (62) – Att: 1,554 at Bellerive Oval
Glenorchy 18.17 (125) v New Norfolk 15.12 (102) – Att: 1,533 at Boyer Oval
Hobart 12.15 (87) v Devonport 12.10 (82) – Att: 1,038 at Devonport Oval
Sth Launceston 33.15 (213) v Launceston 6.13 (49) – Att: 1,250 at York Park (Sunday)
Bye: Nth Launceston.

Round 2
(Saturday, 16 April 1994)
Nth Hobart 18.10 (118) v Hobart 13.4 (82) – Att: 1,698 at North Hobart Oval
New Norfolk 28.20 (188) v Launceston 6.8 (44) – Att: 956 at Boyer Oval
Sandy Bay 16.12 (108) v Nth Launceston 14.19 (103) – Att: 901 at York Park
Sth Launceston 19.10 (124) v Clarence 17.17 (119) – Att: 666 at Youngtown Memorial Ground *
Burnie Hawks 17.15 (117) v Devonport 10.9 (69) – Att: 2,299 at West Park Oval (Night)
Bye: Glenorchy.
Note: Sth Launceston sets record for greatest comeback victory, trailing by 78-points (4.6 to 16.12) during the third quarter.

Round 3
(Saturday, 23 April & Sunday, 24 April 1994)
Sandy Bay 25.12 (162) v Hobart 17.14 (116) – Att: 1,303 at North Hobart Oval
Burnie Hawks 12.18 (90) v Glenorchy 12.16 (88) – Att: 1,309 at KGV Football Park
Clarence 14.9 (93) v Nth Launceston 13.10 (88) – Att: 1,244 at Bellerive Oval
Devonport 24.20 (164) v Launceston 11.7 (73) – Att: 1,088 at Devonport Oval
New Norfolk 20.8 (128) v Nth Hobart 9.5 (59) – Att: 1,895 at Boyer Oval (Sunday)
Bye: Sth Launceston.

Round 4
(Saturday, 7 May & Sunday, 8 May 1994)
New Norfolk 23.13 (151) v Hobart 12.10 (82) – Att: 1,007 at North Hobart Oval
Devonport 18.15 (123) v Sth Launceston 17.18 (120) – Att: 921 at Youngtown Memorial Ground
Burnie Hawks 15.16 (106) v Nth Hobart 10.15 (75) – Att: 1,007 at West Park Oval
Glenorchy 17.12 (114) v Sandy Bay 9.14 (68) – Att: 1,520 at KGV Football Park (Sunday)
Nth Launceston 27.26 (188) v Launceston 7.8 (50) – Att: 821 at York Park (Sunday)
Bye: Clarence.

Round 5
(Saturday, 14 May & Sunday, 15 May 1994)
Sandy Bay 18.10 (118) v Clarence 10.12 (72) – Att: 1,520 at North Hobart Oval
Hobart 13.14 (92) v Nth Launceston 11.20 (86) – Att: 801 at York Park
Sth Launceston 20.13 (133) v Burnie Hawks 13.10 (88) – Att: 847 at Youngtown Memorial Ground
New Norfolk 14.20 (104) v Devonport 12.8 (80) – Att: 1,209 at Devonport Oval
Nth Hobart 18.11 (119) v Glenorchy 15.14 (104) – Att: 2,031 at North Hobart Oval (Sunday)
Bye: Launceston.

Round 6
(Saturday, 21 May 1994)
Sth Launceston 12.22 (94) v Hobart 10.15 (75) – Att: 1,013 at North Hobart Oval
Glenorchy 14.24 (108) v Devonport 8.11 (59) – Att: 1,062 at KGV Football Park
Nth Launceston 17.23 (125) v New Norfolk 11.10 (76) – Att: 1,386 at Boyer Oval
Nth Hobart 15.21 (111) v Launceston 16.3 (99) – Att: 711 at Windsor Park
Clarence 13.8 (86) v Burnie Hawks 9.12 (66) – Att: 756 at West Park Oval (Night)
Bye: Sandy Bay.

Round 7
(Saturday, 28 May & Sunday, 29 May 1994)
Glenorchy 13.15 (93) v Hobart 10.10 (70) – Att: 1,007 at North Hobart Oval
Clarence 18.18 (126) v Launceston 13.8 (86) – Att: 857 at Bellerive Oval
New Norfolk 18.15 (123) v Sth Launceston 13.14 (92) – Att: 1,095 at Youngtown Memorial Ground
Burnie Hawks 19.9 (123) v Nth Launceston 8.11 (59) – Att: 853 at West Park Oval
Sandy Bay 16.5 (101) v Nth Hobart 10.8 (68) – Att: 1,332 at North Hobart Oval (Sunday)
Bye: Devonport.

Round 8
(Saturday, 4 June 1994)
Burnie Hawks 16.14 (110) v Hobart 12.14 (86) – Att: 685 at North Hobart Oval
Glenorchy 22.20 (152) v Sth Launceston 15.9 (99) – Att: 1,034 at KGV Football Park
Nth Hobart 11.11 (77) v Nth Launceston 8.18 (66) – Att: 866 at York Park
Sandy Bay 28.21 (189) v Launceston 5.12 (42) – Att: 805 at Windsor Park
Devonport 14.13 (97) v Clarence 8.12 (60) – Att: 1,061 at Devonport Oval
Bye: New Norfolk.

Round 9
(Saturday, 11 June & Sunday, 12 June 1994)
Nth Hobart 14.17 (101) v Devonport 12.14 (86) – Att: 1,023 at North Hobart Oval
Glenorchy 13.12 (90) v Clarence 7.10 (52) – Att: 1,754 at KGV Football Park
Burnie Hawks 23.20 (158) v Launceston 19.12 (126) – Att: 907 at West Park Oval
Sandy Bay 21.14 (140) v New Norfolk 14.4 (88) – Att: 1,530 at Boyer Oval (Sunday)
Nth Launceston 15.16 (106) v Sth Launceston 4.8 (32) – Att: 1,902 at Youngtown Memorial Ground (Sunday)
Bye: Hobart.

Round 10
(Saturday, 18 June & Sunday, 19 June 1994)
Hobart 26.17 (173) v Launceston 12.7 (79) – Att: 660 at North Hobart Oval
Nth Launceston 7.19 (61) v Glenorchy 7.11 (53) – Att: 1,301 at KGV Football Park
Nth Hobart 14.15 (99) v Sth Launceston 11.14 (80) – Att: 803 at Youngtown Memorial Ground
Devonport 15.9 (99) v Sandy Bay 12.15 (87) – Att: 1,116 at Devonport Oval
Clarence 23.8 (146) v New Norfolk 9.10 (64) – Att: 2,014 at Bellerive Oval (Sunday)
Bye: Burnie Hawks.

Round 11
(Saturday, 25 June & Sunday, 26 June 1994)
Sandy Bay 26.22 (178) v Sth Launceston 13.3 (81) – Att: 855 at North Hobart Oval
New Norfolk 24.19 (163) v Burnie Hawks 16.14 (110) – Att: 844 at Boyer Oval
Glenorchy 30.14 (194) v Launceston 14.6 (90) – Att: 720 at York Park
Clarence 14.10 (94) v Hobart 11.19 (85) – Att: 979 at North Hobart Oval (Sunday)
Devonport 17.14 (116) v Nth Launceston 8.8 (56) – Att: 1,825 at York Park (Sunday)
Bye: Nth Hobart.

Round 12
(Saturday, 2 July & Sunday, 3 July 1994)
Devonport 13.13 (91) v Hobart 8.12 (60) – Att: 642 at North Hobart Oval
Glenorchy 9.12 (66) v New Norfolk 8.14 (62) – Att: 1,758 at KGV Football Park
Sth Launceston 32.20 (212) v Launceston 6.13 (49) – Att: 836 at Youngtown Memorial Ground
Sandy Bay 26.19 (175) v Burnie Hawks 13.15 (93) – Att: 1,073 at West Park Oval
Clarence 17.9 (111) v Nth Hobart 11.6 (72) – Att: 2,008 at North Hobart Oval (Sunday)
Bye: Nth Launceston.

Round 13
(Saturday, 9 July & Sunday, 10 July 1994)
Nth Launceston 18.19 (127) v Sandy Bay 10.11 (71) – Att: 1,028 at North Hobart Oval
Clarence 20.21 (141) v Sth Launceston 15.9 (99) – Att: 1,020 at Bellerive Oval
New Norfolk 17.16 (118) v Launceston 15.11 (101) – Att: 506 at York Park
Nth Hobart 11.11 (77) v Hobart 10.12 (72) – Att: 1,329 at North Hobart Oval (Sunday)
Devonport 17.16 (118) v Burnie Hawks 4.9 (33) – Att: 2,674 at Devonport Oval (Sunday)
Bye: Glenorchy.

Round 14
(Saturday, 16 July & Sunday, 17 July 1994)
New Norfolk 12.17 (89) v Nth Hobart 9.12 (66) – Att: 1,243 at North Hobart Oval
Clarence 21.16 (142) v Nth Launceston 10.14 (74) – Att: 1,135 at York Park
Burnie Hawks 13.12 (90) v Glenorchy 11.11 (77) – Att: 750 at West Park Oval
Sandy Bay 20.9 (129) v Hobart 11.10 (76) – Att: 2,421 at Snug Park (Sunday)
Devonport 18.22 (130) v Launceston 9.3 (57) – Att: 907 at Windsor Park (Sunday)
Bye: Sth Launceston.

Round 15
(Saturday, 23 July 1994)
Sandy Bay 14.16 (100) v Glenorchy 6.10 (46) – Att: 1,894 at KGV Football Park
Nth Launceston 31.12 (198) v Launceston 6.10 (46) – Att: 857 at York Park
Devonport 19.17 (131) v Sth Launceston 9.11 (65) – Att: 1,491 at Devonport Oval (Sunday)
New Norfolk 19.16 (130) v Hobart 12.7 (79) – Att: 980 at Boyer Oval
Bye: Clarence, Burnie Hawks, Nth Hobart.

Round 16
(Saturday, 30 July 1994)
Hobart 9.15 (69) v Nth Launceston 9.15 (69) – Att: 550 at North Hobart Oval
Glenorchy 9.9 (63) v Nth Hobart 6.19 (55) – Att: 1,520 at KGV Football Park
New Norfolk 12.15 (87) v Devonport 12.10 (82) – Att: 1,009 at Boyer Oval
Clarence 17.9 (111) v Sandy Bay 13.5 (83) – Att: 1,674 at Bellerive Oval
Burnie Hawks 17.17 (119) v Sth Launceston 9.9 (63) – Att: 752 at West Park Oval
Bye: Launceston.

Round 17
(Saturday, 6 August 1994)
Nth Hobart 22.15 (147) v Launceston 6.13 (49) – Att: 687 at North Hobart Oval
Burnie Hawks 18.9 (117) v Clarence 14.16 (100) – Att: 1,088 at Bellerive Oval
Nth Launceston 11.17 (83) v New Norfolk 10.14 (74) – Att: 637 at York Park
Sth Launceston 12.13 (85) v Hobart 10.15 (75) – Att: 510 at Youngtown Memorial Ground
Devonport 3.11 (29) v Glenorchy 3.7 (25) – Att: 1,030 at Devonport Oval
Bye: Sandy Bay.

Round 18
(Saturday, 13 August 1994)
Nth Hobart 24.13 (157) v Sandy Bay 9.8 (62) – Att: 1,116 at North Hobart Oval
Glenorchy 12.8 (80) v Hobart 7.17 (59) – Att: 1,040 at KGV Football Park
New Norfolk 10.10 (70) v Sth Launceston 6.10 (46) – Att: 751 at Boyer Oval
Nth Launceston 18.18 (126) v Burnie Hawks 9.11 (65) – Att: 512 at York Park
Clarence 25.18 (168) v Launceston 9.7 (61) – Att: 512 at Windsor Park
Bye: Devonport.

Round 19
(Saturday, 20 August & Sunday, 21 August 1994)
Nth Hobart 15.19 (109) v Nth Launceston 9.14 (68) – Att: 1,176 at North Hobart Oval
Clarence 25.22 (172) v Devonport 13.9 (87) – Att: 1,293 at Bellerive Oval
Sth Launceston 20.16 (136) v Glenorchy 14.10 (94) – Att: 662 at Youngtown Memorial Ground
Burnie Hawks 11.15 (81) v Hobart 10.10 (70) – Att: 705 at West Park Oval
Sandy Bay 30.12 (192) v Launceston 9.14 (68) – Att: 606 at North Hobart Oval (Sunday)
Bye: New Norfolk.

Round 20
(Saturday, 27 August & Sunday, 28 August 1994)
New Norfolk 11.17 (83) v Sandy Bay 8.16 (64) – Att: 1,519 at North Hobart Oval
Burnie Hawks 23.18 (156) v Launceston 5.9 (39) – Att: 567 at Windsor Park
Devonport 14.8 (92) v Nth Hobart 11.11 (77) – Att: 1,579 at Devonport Oval
Clarence 11.5 (71) v Glenorchy 9.14 (68) – Att: 1,870 at Bellerive Oval (Sunday)
Nth Launceston 28.18 (186) v Sth Launceston 14.19 (103) – Att: 1,041 at York Park (Sunday)
Bye: Hobart.

Qualifying Final
(Saturday, 3 September 1994)
Sandy Bay: 4.2 (26) | 6.6 (42) | 11.9 (75) | 13.13 (91)
New Norfolk: 5.5 (35) | 9.10 (64) | 9.11 (65) | 11.15 (81)
Attendance: 3,103 at North Hobart Oval

Elimination Final
(Sunday, 4 September 1994)
Devonport Blues: 2.5 (17) | 5.6 (36) | 14.6 (90) | 16.8 (104)
Burnie Hawks: 2.1 (13) | 5.6 (36) | 7.7 (49) | 8.10 (58)
Attendance: 4,210 at Devonport Oval

Second Semi Final
(Saturday, 10 September 1994)
Clarence: 4.3 (27) | 6.6 (42) | 10.10 (70) | 12.13 (85)
Sandy Bay: 1.8 (14) | 6.11 (47) | 7.14 (56) | 9.16 (70)
Attendance: 3,460 at North Hobart Oval

First Semi Final
(Sunday, 11 September 1994)
New Norfolk: 5.4 (34) | 10.12 (72) | 16.13 (109) | 22.18 (150)
Devonport: 4.1 (25) | 7.4 (46) | 9.8 (62) | 15.10 (100)
Attendance: 3,062 at North Hobart Oval

Preliminary Final
(Sunday, 18 September 1994)
New Norfolk: 5.5 (35) | 9.16 (70) | 12.20 (92) | 15.21 (111)
Sandy Bay: 0.1 (1) | 2.3 (15) | 6.5 (41) | 13.7 (85)
Attendance: 3,610 at North Hobart Oval

Grand Final
(Saturday, 24 September 1994) – (ABC-TV highlights: 1994 TFL Grand Final)
Clarence: 5.3 (33) | 6.6 (42) | 9.10 (64) | 13.13 (91)
New Norfolk: 3.1 (19) | 5.2 (32) | 6.3 (39) | 8.5 (53)
Attendance: 14,230 at North Hobart Oval

Source: All scores and statistics courtesy of the Hobart Mercury, Launceston Examiner and North West Advocate publications.

Tasmanian Football League seasons